The Baseball America College Player of the Year Award is an award given by Baseball America to the best college baseball player of the year. The award has been given annually since 1981.

Winners

See also

List of college baseball awards
Baseball awards#U.S. college baseball
College Baseball Hall of Fame

Notes

References

External links
Baseball America official website

College baseball player of the year awards in the United States
Awards established in 1981